Directorio is Spanish for Directorate and could refer to:

Cuban Democratic Directorate, a nongovernmental organization that supports the human rights movement in Cuba.
Directorio, early 19th century government of Argentina.